Ileana Gyarfaș (born 8 January 1932) is a Romanian gymnast. She competed in seven events at the 1952 Summer Olympics.

References

External links
 

1932 births
Possibly living people
Romanian female artistic gymnasts
Olympic gymnasts of Romania
Gymnasts at the 1952 Summer Olympics
Sportspeople from Cluj-Napoca